Wendell Arthur Garrity Jr. (June 20, 1920 – September 16, 1999) was a United States district judge of the United States District Court for the District of Massachusetts notable for issuing the 1974 order in Morgan v. Hennigan which mandated that Boston schools be desegregated by means of busing.

Education and career

Born in Worcester, Massachusetts, Garrity received an Artium Baccalaureus degree from College of the Holy Cross in 1941, and was then a Sergeant in the United States Army during World War II, from 1943-45. He received a Bachelor of Laws from Harvard Law School in 1946, and served as a law clerk to Francis Ford of the United States District Court for the District of Massachusetts from 1946 to 1947. Garrity entered private practice in Boston and Worcester from 1947 to 1948. He was an Assistant United States Attorney for the District of Massachusetts from 1948 to 1950, lecturing in federal jurisdiction and procedure at Boston College Law School from 1950 to 1951. He was in private practice in Boston from 1951 to 1961. He was the United States Attorney for the District of Massachusetts from 1961 to 1966.

Federal judicial service

Garrity was nominated by President Lyndon B. Johnson on May 23, 1966, to the United States District Court for the District of Massachusetts, to a new seat authorized by 75 Stat. 80. He was confirmed by the United States Senate on June 24, 1966, and received his commission on June 24, 1966. He assumed senior status on December 1, 1985. His service terminated on September 16, 1999, due to his death of cancer in Wellesley, Massachusetts.

Boston school busing case

As a federal judge, Garrity was at the center of a contentious battle over desegregation busing in Boston from the 1970s to the 1980s. He found a recurring pattern of racial discrimination in the operation of the Boston public schools in a 1974 ruling. His ruling found the schools were unconstitutionally segregated.

As a remedy, he used a busing plan developed by the Massachusetts State Board of Education to implement the state's Racial Imbalance Law that had been passed by the Massachusetts state legislature a few years earlier, requiring any school with a student enrollment that was more than 50% nonwhite to be balanced according to race. The Boston School Committee consistently disobeyed orders from the state Board of Education. Garrity's ruling, upheld on appeal by conservative judges on the United States Court of Appeals for the First Circuit and by the Supreme Court led by Warren Burger, required school children to be brought to different schools to end segregation and led to the Boston busing crisis of 1974-88. By the final Garrity-decided court case in 1988, Garrity had assumed more control over a school system than any judge in American history.

An obituary in the New York Times noted that

Family

Garrity's brother was John T. Garrity, former Managing Director of McKinsey & Company, and his nephew is technology analyst David Garrity.

See also

References

Sources

External links
 W. Arthur Garrity, Jr. papers on the Boston Schools Desegregation Case, 1972-1997, University Archives and Special Collections, Joseph P. Healey Library, University of Massachusetts Boston
 Digitized materials from the W. Arthur Garrity, Jr. chambers papers on the Boston Schools Desegregation case, University Archives and Special Collections, Joseph P. Healey Library, University of Massachusetts Boston

1920 births
1999 deaths
People from Worcester, Massachusetts
Military personnel from Massachusetts
College of the Holy Cross alumni
Harvard Law School alumni
Boston College faculty
United States Attorneys for the District of Massachusetts
Judges of the United States District Court for the District of Massachusetts
United States district court judges appointed by Lyndon B. Johnson
20th-century American judges
United States Army personnel of World War II
Assistant United States Attorneys